Paul M. Grøstad (21 September 1933 – 4 April 2011) was a Norwegian businessperson.

He took the cand.jur. degree, and worked in Norske Shell (Royal Dutch Shell in Norway) from 1960 to 1993. He is best known as the chairman of the company, from 1997 to 2003.

During his time in Norske Shell, he was involved in both building up and closing down the oil refinery in Sola. The company also became involved in the Ormen Lange gas field, eventually becoming the field operator. Grøstad also handled a boycott of Shell, which started because of alleged corporation with apartheid-era South Africa.

References

1933 births
2011 deaths
Norwegian jurists
Norwegian businesspeople
People in the petroleum industry
Shell plc people